Louise Wischermann (born February 25, 1974 in Salvador, Brazil) is a former actress best known for her appearance in the science-fiction television series LEXX.

Louise Wischermann was born in Salvador, Brazil on 25 February 1974. At the age of 18, she went to Germany to study at the Gmelin München acting studio and then went on to act professionally. She is best known for her role as Lyekka, a flesh-eating plant life-form, in the science-fiction television series LEXX. Since giving up acting she has explored several business ventures.

Wischermann spends most of her time in Toronto. She is 169 cm tall and enjoys such activities as skydiving, hang gliding, swimming, horse riding and volleyball. She is fluent in English, Portuguese and Spanish and speaks some German. Her favorite music genres are jazz and percussion. In 2005 she was diagnosed with multiple sclerosis.

Filmography

1986–1989: Xou Da Xuxa (Pituxa)
1991: Filhos do Sol
1992: Marienhof
1998: Mallorca – Suche nach dem Paradies (Carmen Diaz)
1998-2001: Lexx: The Series (Lyekka, Lulu)
2000: Aquarela do Brasil
2000: Die Wache
2002: O Redentor
2002: This is Hollywood/Everything About Entertainment
2002: Luca's World Travel Show

External links
 
 Louise Wischermann official site

Brazilian television actresses
Brazilian people of German descent
1974 births
Living people
People from Salvador, Bahia